The Sexual Life of the Savages (subtitled Underground Post-Punk from São Paulo, Brazil) is a compilation album produced by Bruno Verner and Eliete Mejorado (the components of avant-garde music duo Tetine), and released in 2005 by British record company Soul Jazz Records. It contains a collection of songs from various artists that formed the São Paulo post-punk movement of the early 1980s. The album's name is an allusion to a verse of the song "Nosso Louco Amor" by Gang 90 e as Absurdettes, one of the bands present in the compilation.

Depicted in the album's front cover is Patife Band's frontman Paulo Barnabé.

Critical reception

The album received positive reviews. Scott Hreha of PopMatters stated: "If there's one drawback to the disc as a whole, it's the relative transparency of many of the bands' inspirations, which doesn't diminish its importance as much as it makes for an entertaining critical exercise". Hreha also praised the album's "remastered sound" and "availability", noting that "most of this music was recorded for independent labels that have long since folded". Pitchfork critic Nitsuh Abebe wrote that the album "doubles up tracks on key artists and feels mixed for continuity". Abebe further stated: "It kicks off with its most accessible pop and then swings, as befits a Soul Jazz product, into a midsection that piles on the funk".

Track listing

Personnel
Technical personnel
 Bruno Verner – production, compiling
 Eliete Mejorado – production, compiling
 Adrian Self – cover art
 Quid Proque – cover art 
 Duncan Cowell – mastering
 Pete Reilly – mastering

See also
 Não Wave
 Não São Paulo, Vol. 1
 Não São Paulo, Vol. 2

References

External links
 Soul Jazz Records – The Sexual Life Of The Savages – Underground Post-Punk from Sao Paulo, Brasil; page for the album at Soul Jazz's official website
The Sexual Life of the Savages at Discogs
The Sexual Life of the Savages at Rate Your Music

2005 compilation albums
Alternative rock compilation albums
Post-punk compilation albums
Compilation albums by Brazilian artists
Soul Jazz Records compilation albums